Nha Trang University is a university in Nha Trang, Khánh Hòa Province, in Vietnam's South Central Coast. It is a multidisciplinary university offering 36 programs for bachelor degrees, 16 programs for master's degrees and 6 programs for doctoral degrees.

History

Nha Trang University was founded on August 1, 1959 as the Fisheries Faculty of Hanoi Institute of Agriculture and Forestry. Following the Decision No. 155-CP of the Prime Minister signed on August 16, 1966 the Faculty was separated and named the School of Fisheries. In 1977, the School moved from Hai Phong to Nha Trang and changed its name to the University of Marine Products. In 1980, the university’s name became University of Fisheries. The university has carried its current name "Nha Trang University" since July 25, 2006 according to Decision No. 172/2006/QD-TTg of the Prime Minister.

With a significant contribution in training and research, Nha Trang University has been granted many prestigious government awards: No. 3 Labour Medal, No. 2 Labour Medal, No. 1 Labour Medal; No. 3 Independence Medal, No. 2 Independence Medal, and No. 2 Independence Medal. In July 2006, the government granted the university the Labour Hero Medal.

In accordance with the national higher education reform plan, NTU had prepared to transform from a year-based training system to the credit-based training system since 1990. The credit system has gradually been adopted since 1995, enhancing training quality and services and recognizing students as the center of the training process. Nha Trang University was among the first 20 universities of Vietnam that were assessed and accredited in 2009 by The National Council for Higher Education Accreditation and Quality Assurance. In 2018, Nha Trang University successfully got higher education accreditation for the second time. Besides, the first two training programs: Ship Engineering and Seafood Processing Technology were accredited in 2019.

Faculties and Institutes
Nha Trang University has the following faculties:
Faculty of Food Technology
Faculty of Information Technology
Faculty of Transportation Engineering 
Faculty of Mechanical Engineering 
Faculty of Electrical & Electronic Engineering 
Faculty of Economics 
Faculty of Civil Engineering 
Faculty of Accounting and Finance 
Faculty of Social Sciences and Humanities
Faculty of Foreign Languages 
Faculty of Tourism
Institute for Biotechnology & Environment
Institute for Aquaculture 
Institute for Marine Science & Fishing Technology
Institute for Ship Research and Development (UNINSHIP)
Center for Aquatic Animal Health and Breeding
Center for Software Technology R & D
Center for Foreign Languages
Center for Military and Security Education

References

External links

Nha Trang
Universities in Vietnam
Buildings and structures in Khánh Hòa province